The Science Fiction Galaxy is an anthology of science fiction short stories edited by Groff Conklin. It was first published in hardcover by Permabooks in 1950.

The book collects twelve novelettes and short stories by various authors, together with an introduction by the editor. The stories were previously published from 1909 to 1949 in various science fiction and other magazines.

Contents
"Introduction" (Groff Conklin)
"The Machine Stops" (E. M. Forster)
"As Easy as A.B.C." (Rudyard Kipling)
"The Derelict" (William Hope Hodgson)
"The Fires Within" (Arthur C. Clarke)
"A Child Is Crying" (John D. MacDonald)
"Quis Custodiet .... ?" (Margaret St. Clair)
"The Life-Work of Professor Muntz" (Murray Leinster)
"The Appendix and the Spectacles" (Miles J. Breuer)
"Death from the Stars" (A. Rowley Hilliard)
"The Hurkle Is a Happy Beast" (Theodore Sturgeon)
"King of the Gray Spaces" (Ray Bradbury)
"The Living Galaxy" (Laurence Manning)

Notes

1950 anthologies
Science fiction anthologies
Groff Conklin anthologies